The West-Metcalfe House, in Wayne County, Kentucky, about  south of Mill Springs on the Cumberland River, was built in 1800.  It was listed on the National Register of Historic Places in 1977.

It served in December 1861 as the headquarters for Confederate general Felix Zollicoffer before the Battle of Logan's Crossroads (also known as Battle of Mill Springs and as Battle of Fishing Creek), a disastrous defeat for the Confederates delivered by Union forces of George H. Thomas.

It is a one-and-a-half-story Georgian-style brick house.

It was built by Captain Isaac West (1768-1830), a Kentucky state legislator and prominent local citizen.

See also
Battle of Mill Springs Historic Areas, also listed on the National Register and a National Historic Landmark

References

National Register of Historic Places in Wayne County, Kentucky
Houses completed in 1800
Battle of Mill Springs
1800 establishments in Kentucky
American Civil War on the National Register of Historic Places
Houses on the National Register of Historic Places in Kentucky
Georgian architecture in Kentucky